The wolf (Canis lupus) is a large canine native to Eurasia and North America.

Wolf or wolves may also refer to:

Animals
Other canids and carnivores known as wolves include:
 African golden wolf (Canis anthus)
 Armbruster's wolf (Canis armbrusteri), extinct canine of North America
 Coywolf, a wolf coyote hybrid
 Dire wolf (Aenocyon dirus), extinct canine of North America
 Edward's wolf (Canis edwardii), extinct canine of North America
 Ethiopian wolf (Canis simensis), also known as Abyssinian wolf
 Falkland Islands wolf (Dusicyon australis), extinct canine of Falkland Islands off Argentina's Coastline
 Hare-eating wolf (Canis lepophagus), extinct canine of North America
 Maned wolf (Chrysocyon brachyurus), a South American canid species
 Mountain wolf or red wolf (Cuon alpinus), better known as dhole or Indian wild dog
 Painted wolf or ornate wolf (Lycaon pictus), better known as the African wild dog
 Prairie wolf (Canis latrans), better known as the coyote
 Red wolf (Canis rufus), an endangered canine of the Southeastern United States sometimes considered a subspecies of the gray wolf
 Reed wolf (Canis aureus moreoticus), better known as the European jackal, a subspecies of golden jackal
 Rocky Mountain wolf (disambiguation)
 Tasmanian wolf or marsupial wolf (Thylacinus cynocephalus), an extinct Australian mammal
 Tiger wolf (Crocuta crocuta), better known as the spotted hyena
 Timber wolf (disambiguation)
 Tweed wolf or eastern coyote, a variety of coywolf
 Zhoukoudian wolf (Canis variabilis), an extinct canine of Central and East Asia

Astronomy 
 14P/Wolf, a periodic comet
 Wolf (crater), a lunar crater

Arts and entertainment

Fictional characters
 See Wolf (name)

Film
 Wolf (1955 film), a Japanese film
 Wolf (1994 film), a film starring Jack Nicholson
 Wolf (2008 film), a film by Daniel Alfredson
 Wolf (2013 film), a Dutch film by Jim Taihuttu
 Wolf (2021 Indian film), a Malayalam thriller film by Shaji Azeez
 Wolf (2021 Irish-Polish film), an Irish-Polish drama film
 Wolves (1930 film), a film starring Charles Laughton
 Wolves (1999 film), a documentary short
 Wolves (2014 film), a Canadian action horror film starring Lucas Till
 Wolves (2016 film), an American sports drama film starring Michael Shannon
 The Wolf (1916 film), a Hungarian film
 The Wolf, a 1919 film by James Young
 The Wolf (2004 film) or El Lobo, a Spanish biographical film by Miguel Courtois
 The Wolves (1956 film),  Italian neorealistic drama film starring Silvana Mangano
 The Wolves (1971 film), a Japanese film

Music

Bands
 Wolf (band), a Swedish heavy metal band

Albums
 Wolf (Hugh Cornwell album) (1988)
 Wolf (Trevor Rabin album) (1981)
 Wolf (Tyler, the Creator album) (2013)
 Wolves (Deadlock album) (2007)
 Wolves (Idiot Pilot album) (2007)
 Wolves (My Latest Novel album) (2006)
 Wolves, an unreleased collab album between Kanye West and Drake (2015)
 Wolves (Rise Against album) (2017)
 Wolves (Story of the Year album) (2017)
 Wolves, an album by Kyle Cook (2018)

Songs
 "Wolf" (song), a 2013 song by Exo
 "Wolves" (Big Sean song) (2020)
 "Wolves" (Kanye West song) (2016)
 "Wolves" (Selena Gomez and Marshmello song) (2017)
 "The Wolves" (song), a 2011 song by Ben Howard
 "Wolves" (Garbage song) (2021)
 "Wolf", a song by The Beau Brummels from The Beau Brummels (1975)
 "Wolf", a song by First Aid Kit from The Lion's Roar (2012)
 "Wolf", a song by Iced Earth from Horror Show (2001)
 "Wolf", a song by Nash the Slash from Children of the Night (1981)
 "Wolf", a song by Tungevaag & Raaban (2016)
 "Wolf", a song by Veruca Salt from American Thighs (1994)
 "Wolf", a song by Joe Walsh from The Smoker You Drink, the Player You Get (1973)
 "Wolves", a song by Ryan Adams from 1984 (2014)
 "Wolves", a song by Big Wreck from Albatross (2012)
 "Wolves", a song by Garth Brooks from No Fences (1990)
 "Wolves", a song by Machine Head from The Blackening (2007)
 "Wolves", a song by Rise Against from Wolves (2017)
 "Wolves", a song by Scale the Summit from Monument (2007)
 "Wolves", a song by Wu-Tang Clan from 8 Diagrams (2007)
 "Wolves (Song of the Shepherd's Dog)", a song by Iron & Wine from The Shepherd's Dog (2007)
 "The Wolf", a song by Chelsea Grin from Eternal Nightmare (2018)
 "The Wolf", a song by Eddie Vedder from Into the Wild (2007)
 "The Wolves", a song by Pharaoh from Bury the Light (2012)
 "The Wolves (Act I and II)", a song by Bon Iver from For Emma, Forever Ago (2007)

Television
 The Wolf (TV series), a 2020 Chinese television series
 Wolf (American TV series), a 1989 CBS TV-series set in San Francisco
 Wolf (Thai TV series), a 2019 Thai television series
 Wolf (miniseries), a 2018 Turkish-language television miniseries
 Wolf, a segment of CNN Newsroom hosted by Wolf Blitzer

Other uses in arts and entertainment
 The Wolf, a 1908 play by Eugene Walter
 The Wolves (play), a 2016 play by Sarah DeLappe
 Wolf (novel), a children's novel by Gillian Cross
 Wolves (book), a children's book by Emily Gravett
 Lupin III or Wolf, a manga and anime series
 W.O.L.F. (Winter Operational Light Fighting Vehicle), a fictional vehicle in the G.I. Joe universe

Military 
 HMS Wolf, 16 ships of the British Royal Navy
 SMS Wolf, an armed merchant raider of the German Imperial Navy in World War I
 Land Rover Wolf, a military utility vehicle in service with UK Armed Forces and the Dutch Marine Corps
 Wolf Armoured Vehicle, an Israeli-produced armored personnel carrier
 Wolf, the military designation for the Mercedes-Benz G-Class in the German Bundeswehr

People
 Wolf (name), a given name and surname, including a list of people and characters with the name
The Wolves (professional wrestling), or the American Wolves, the tag team of Davey Richards and Eddie Edwards

Places 
 Wolf (river), a river of Baden-Württemberg, Germany
 Wolf (volcano), an active volcano in the Galápagos Islands, Ecuador
 Wolf, California, US
 Wolf, Kansas, US
 Wolf, Minnesota, US
 Wolf, Ohio, US
 Wolf, Oklahoma, US
 Wolf, Wyoming, US
 Wolf Township, Lycoming County, Pennsylvania, US
 The Wolves (Bristol Channel), two treacherous rocks in the Bristol Channel, UK

Radio and television stations
 107.7 The Wolf, an independent station in Wolverhampton, UK
 KPLX-FM The Wolf (99.5), a country music station in Dallas/Fort Worth, Texas, United States
 WCIS-FM (WOLF-FM), a radio station (105.1 FM) licensed to DeRuyter, New York, United States
 WDAF-FM The Wolf (106.5), a country music station in Kansas City, Missouri, United States
 WIWF, a radio station (96.9 FM) licensed to Charleston, South Carolina, United States
 WLFF, a radio station (106.5 FM) licensed to Georgetown, South Carolina, United States
 WOLF (AM), a radio station (1490 AM) licensed to Syracuse, New York, United States
 The Wolf (radio network), a defunct nationwide radio network in New Zealand
 WOLF-FM, a radio station (92.1 FM) licensed to Baldwinsville, New York, United States
 WPAW, a radio station (93.1 FM) licensed to Winston-Salem, North Carolina, United States
 WQSL, a radio station (92.3 FM) licensed to Jacksonville, North Carolina, United States 
 WQZL, a radio station (101.1 FM) licensed to Belhaven, North Carolina, United States
 WOLF-TV, a television station (channel 22, virtual 56) licensed to Hazleton, Pennsylvania, United States

Sports teams

Australia
 Brisbane Wolves FC, an Australian soccer team
 Wollongong Wolves FC, an Australian rules football team
 Western Wolves FC, an Australian rules football team
 Windsor Wolves, an Australian rugby team

Canada
 Akwesasne Wolves, a hockey team
 La Tuque Wolves, a hockey team
 Ottawa Wolves, a rugby team
 Ripley Wolves, a hockey team
 St. Catharines Wolves, a soccer team
 Shelburne Wolves, a hockey team
 Sudbury Wolves, a team in the Ontario Hockey League
 Sudbury Jr. Wolves, former name of the Rayside-Balfour Canadians, a team in the Northern Ontario Junior Hockey League
 Sudbury Wolves (EPHL), a defunct team in the Eastern Professional Hockey League
 Lakehead Thunderwolves, athletic program of lakehead University

United Kingdom
 Edinburgh Wolves, a Scottish American Football team
 Warrington Wolves, an English rugby league team
 Wolverhampton Wanderers F.C., an English football team commonly known as "Wolves"
 Wolverhampton Wolves, an English Speedway team
 Worcester Wolves, a British basketball team

United States
 Carolina Raging Wolves, a football team
 Chicago Wolves, a minor league ice hockey team
 Connecticut Wolves, a soccer team
 Detroit Wolves, a baseball team
 Idaho Wolves, a soccer team
 Los Angeles Wolves, a former professional soccer team
 Manchester Wolves, a minor league arena football team
 Stockton Wolves, an arena football team
 Wisconsin Wolves, a football team

Elsewhere
 EHL Wolves, a Swiss ice hockey team
 Faisalabad Wolves, a Pakistani cricket team
 La Louvière Wolves, a Belgian American football team
 Tangerang Wolves F.C., an Indonesian football team
 VfL Wolfsburg or the Wolves (in German, Die Wölfe), a German football club
 Warri Wolves F.C., a Nigerian soccer team
 Wayamba Wolves, a Sri Lankan cricket team

Other uses
 Wolf (brand) or Wolf Cooking, a sister brand to Sub-Zero Refrigerator
 Wolf (card game), an historic variant of the card game Tippen
 Wolf (train), a South Devon Railway Eagle class 4-4-0ST steam locomotive
 Wolf (video game), a 1994 simulation game where the player takes the role of a wolf
 Wolf Ammunition, a line of ammunition associated with Sporting Supplies International
 Wolf Prize, a science and art award
 Wolf Racing Cars, an Italian racing car manufacturer
 Women's Liberation Front (WoLF), an American non-profit radical feminist organization
 WOLF, the ".wol" file extension used for eBooks on the Hanlin eReader

See also 
 Giant otter or river wolf, Pteronura brasiliensis
 subspecies of Canis lupus
 The Wolf (disambiguation)
 Wolf Brigade (disambiguation), a variety of military and paramilitary units
 Wolfe (disambiguation)
 Wolff, a surname
 Wolfs (disambiguation)
 Woolfe: The Red Hood Diaries,  a video game
 Wolof (disambiguation)
 Wulf (disambiguation)
 WOLV (disambiguation)
 
 
 
 
 
 

Animal common name disambiguation pages